The glossy-black thrush (Turdus serranus) is a species of bird in the family Turdidae. It is found from northern Venezuela to northwestern Argentina.  Its natural habitat is subtropical or tropical moist montane forests.

References

glossy-black thrush
Birds of the Northern Andes
glossy-black thrush
Taxonomy articles created by Polbot